Sai Educational Rural & Urban Development Society (SERUDS) is a voluntary and not for profit organization in India. It is a Non-Governmental Organisation serving in India in various states like Andhra Pradesh, Tamil Nadu, Karnataka, Delhi. SERUDS raises funds and contributions from individuals and organisations across India and the world and then uses these donations to serve the needs of deprived children, economically disadvantaged women, youth empowerment and hapless elderly people.

SERUDS NGO India is listed in GiveIndia, Give2asia, Joy of Giving, Give foundation, Global giving, Samhita, Credibility Alliance, God Parents Foundation, Vaniindia, Guidestar India websites as an NGO for its commitment for working in rural and urban slums for last eight years in upliftment of the society. SERUDS has been working at the grass root level and is one of the upcoming NGO with operations nationally in India especially in the states of Andhra Pradesh, Tamil Nadu, Karnataka, Delhi, in India.

SERUDS is registered under societies registration act of 1860, registered under FCRA under Ministry of Home affairs, Income tax act for income tax exemption with Government of India.

History

SERUDS NGO was conceived in 2003 by Mallikarjuna.G an Engineering graduate from one of the top engineering colleges in India who got inspired at the age of 24 started SERUDS to serve the society. Today SERUDS is growing and serving the needs in five districts of Andhra Pradesh apart from other Indian states. It is run and managed by a team of like minded professionals. SERUDS always wanted to work for the holistic development of poorer and has compassion towards the sufferings of deprived and downtrodden sections of the society.

Vision

Distribute the Fruits of Development to all the Sections of the Society.

Ongoing initiatives

Nutritious mid day meals to the hapless elderly, destitute and poor people.

Four day care centres with play items and mid day meals for children up to six years old of working mothers in hazardous jobs.

Skill development including Fashion Design training to the Economically disadvantaged Women.

Running a Children's orphanage.

Distribution of Educational Material, text and notebooks, Uniforms to the economically disadvantaged poor students in the Government High Schools.

Sponsorship of school fee and other needs to the bright students belonging to poor families.

References

External links
 The Seruds India website

Non-profit organisations based in India
Web portals
Charities based in India